Seaport of the Prairies was a documentary film made in 1925, in an attempt to revise the construction of a railroad line to a new deepwater port at Port Nelson, Manitoba.  It follows a journey of a group of prominent citizens as they transit the route.

The 2 reel silent film was originally filmed on 35mm acetate film, a technology abandoned because the film stock was unstable, prone to decay, and was highly flammable.  The only known existing print is a copy to 16mm conventional film stock.  The film is approximately an hour long.

Director Frank Holmes was just 17 years old when he made the film.

The port, and rail link, were worked on from 1913 to 1917.  The project was left incomplete, when World War I required its construction resources.

When funds were found to complete the project, its destination was changed from Port Nelson to Churchill, Manitoba, due to technical problems with maintaining a port at Port Nelson.

The party left The Pas, Manitoba, in an especially chartered train, traveling across northern Manitoba, to "the end of steel", at Kettle Rapids, Manitoba, where resources to build the railway ran out. They then proceeded by canoe to near the Port facilities, where they transferred to "Government boats".

Holmes had to go to court to receive his payment for making the film.

References

1925 films
1925 documentary films
Canadian documentary films
Canadian silent films
Canadian black-and-white films
1920s Canadian films